The Instituto de Educación Media Superior de la Ciudad de México (IEMS-CDMX or IEMS "High School Education Institute of Mexico City") is the public preparatoria education system of Mexico City.

The government of Mexico City founded the institution in 2000 to increase admission rates into public high schools.

Schools

Álvaro Obregón
Escuela Preparatoria Álvaro Obregón I "Lázaro Cárdenas del Río"
Escuela Preparatoria Álvaro Obregón II "Vasco de Quiroga"
Azcapotzalco
Escuela Preparatoria Azcapotzalco "Melchor Ocampo"
Coyoacán
Escuela Preparatoria Coyoacán "Ricardo Flores Magón"
Cuajimalpa
Escuela Preparatoria Cuajimalpa "Josefa Ortiz de Domínguez"
Gustavo A. Madero
Escuela Preparatoria Gustavo A. Madero I "Belisario Domínguez"
Escuela Preparatoria Gustavo A. Madero II "Salvador Allende"
Iztacalco
Escuela Preparatoria Iztacalco "Felipe Carrillo Puerto"
Iztapalapa
Escuela Preparatoria Iztapalapa I
Escuela Preparatoria Iztapalapa II "Benito Juárez"
Escuela Preparatoria Iztapalapa III "Miravalles"
Escuela Preparatoria Iztapalapa IV
Magdalena Contreras
Escuela Preparatoria Magdalena Contreras "Ignacio Manuel Altamirano"
Miguel Hidalgo
Escuela Preparatoria Miguel Hidalgo "Carmen Serdán"
Milpa Alta
Escuela Preparatoria Milpa Alta "Emiliano Zapata"
Tláhuac
Escuela Preparatoria Tláhuac "José Ma. Morelos y Pavón"
Tlalpan
Escuela Preparatoria Tlalpan I "Gral. Francisco J. Múgica"
Escuela Preparatoria Tlalpan II "Otilio Montaño"
Venustiano Carranza
Escuela Preparatoria Venustiano Carranza "José Revueltas Sánchez"
Xochimilco
Escuela Preparatoria Xochimilco "Bernardino de Sahagún"

References

External links
 Instituto de Educación Media Superior del Distrito Federal 
 
 

.
2000 establishments in Mexico
Educational institutions established in 2000